Edmund Boyd Osler (21 August 1919 – 1 April 1987) was a Canadian politician and Liberal member of the House of Commons of Canada.

He was born in Winnipeg in 1919 and graduated from the Royal Military College of Canada in Kingston, Ontario in 1937. He also studied at War Staff College, Royal Canadian Air Force. He served as a Royal Canadian Air Force sergeant pilot and was promoted to squadron leader from 1940 to 1945. Upon retirement, he worked as an insurance executive and writer. He died in Winnipeg in 1987.

He was first elected in the 1968 general election at the Winnipeg South Centre riding and served one term, the 28th Canadian Parliament. Osler left Parliament after his defeat in the 1972 election to A. Daniel McKenzie of the Progressive Conservative party.

E. B. Osler was the author of A Light in the Wilderness (1953) and The Man Who had to Hang Louis Riel (1961) and La Salle (1967). He was the grandson and namesake of the 19th century businessman and politician Edmund Boyd Osler.

Electoral  history

References

External links
 

1919 births
1987 deaths
Liberal Party of Canada MPs
Members of the House of Commons of Canada from Manitoba
Politicians from Winnipeg
Royal Military College of Canada alumni